Gehling is a surname. Notable people with the surname include:

Bill Gehling (born 1951), Australian rules footballer
Drew Gehling (born 1982), American actor
Keith Gehling (born 1956), American soccer player

See also
Gerling (surname)